Sirenavus was an early sea cow from the Eocene of Hungary (Eger-Kis-Eged, Felsogalla, Felsotarkany and Urom).

Location
Fossils of Sirenavus are known from the Eocene deposits in Hungary.

See also 
Evolution of sirenians

References 

Eocene sirenians
Lutetian life
Bartonian life
Priabonian life
Eocene mammals of Europe
Fossils of Hungary
Fossil taxa described in 1941
Prehistoric placental genera